Pseudeuchlora is a monotypic moth genus in the family Geometridae erected by George Hampson in 1895. Its only species, Pseudeuchlora kafebera, was first described by Charles Swinhoe in 1894. It is found in Asia, including India.

References

Moths described in 1894
Larentiinae
Monotypic moth genera